Eemil Viro (born 3 April 2002) is a Finnish professional ice hockey defenceman currently playing for the Grand Rapids Griffins in the American Hockey League (AHL) as a prospect to the Detroit Red Wings of the National Hockey League (NHL). Viro was drafted 70th overall by the Red Wings in the 2020 NHL Entry Draft. He formerly playing in the Finnish Liiga with HC TPS.

Playing career
On 21 May 2021, Viro was signed by the Red Wings to a three-year, entry-level contract.

Personal life
Viro's twin sister plays ringette in the Finnish professional league Ringeten SM-sarja.

Career statistics

Regular season and playoffs

International

References

External links
 

2002 births
Living people
Detroit Red Wings draft picks
Finnish ice hockey defencemen
Finnish twins
Grand Rapids Griffins players
Toledo Walleye players
HC TPS players
Sportspeople from Vantaa
Twin sportspeople